John Martin "Marty" Gateman (born December 7, 1952 in Southampton, Ontario) is a Canadian retired ice hockey defenceman.

Gateman played junior hockey for the Hamilton Red Wings in the Ontario Hockey Association. He was drafted 79th overall by the New York Rangers in the 1972 NHL Amateur Draft but never played in the National Hockey League. Gateman turned pro in 1972 with the Central Hockey League's Omaha Knights. He then spent three years in the American Hockey League with the Providence Reds. He moved to the Cape Codders of the North American Hockey League before playing 12 games for the New England Whalers of the World Hockey Association and then returning to the NAHL with the Binghamton Dusters. Gateman spent one final year in the International Hockey League with the Fort Wayne Komets and back in the American Hockey League with the Rhode Island Reds before retiring in 1977.

External links

1952 births
Binghamton Dusters players
Canadian ice hockey defencemen
Cape Codders players
Fort Wayne Komets players
Hamilton Red Wings (OHA) players
Ice hockey people from Ontario
Living people
New England Whalers players
New York Rangers draft picks
Omaha Knights (CHL) players
Providence Reds players
Rhode Island Reds players